Meece may refer to:

People

David Meece (born 1952), contemporary Christian musician
John William Meece (1843–1924), American politician, member of the Mississippi legislature
Lauren Meece (born 1983), American judoka 
Roger A. Meece (born 1949), American diplomat

Other
Cold Meece, village near Swynnerton, Staffordshire, UK
Cold Meece railway station, railway station serving the Royal Ordnance Factory at Swynnerton during WWII
Mill Meece Pumping Station, pumping station in the village of Millmeece, Staffordshire, England
Warden Cyrus Meece, fictional character from the animated series SWAT Kats

See also
 Meese (disambiguation)